Canthigaster margaritata, the pearl toby, is a species of "toby" or "sharpnose puffer" (Canthigaster), which is part of the pufferfish family, Tetraodontidae. This reef fish is found in Indo-Pacific waters, including the Red Sea.

References

 
 Canthigaster margaritata, World Register of Marine Species

External links
 

margaritata
Fish of the Red Sea
Fish described in 1829